Udayabhanu may refer to:

Udaya Bhanu (actress), Indian actress
K. P. Udayabhanu, Indian singer and music director
A. P. Udhayabhanu, Indian freedom fighter and author